A Song for You is an album by bassist Ron Carter recorded at Van Gelder Studio in 1978 and released on the Milestone label.

Reception

AllMusic awarded the album 3 stars with its review by Ron Wynn stating, "A change of pace session for Carter... Things generally work, although sometimes the low energy level and lack of tension threaten to turn this into easy listening material".

Track listing
All compositions by Ron Carter.
 "A Song for You" (Leon Russell) – 4:51
 "El Ojo de Dios" – 6:35
 "A Quiet Place" (Ralph Carmichael) – 6:14
 "Good Time" – 7:00
 "Someday My Prince Will Come" (Frank Churchill, Larry Morey) – 5:01
 "N.O. Blues" – 6:26

Personnel
Ron Carter – bass, piccolo bass, arranger
Leon Pendarvis (track 1), Kenny Barron (tracks 2-6) – piano
Jay Berliner – acoustic guitar, electric guitar (tracks 1-3)
Jack DeJohnette – drums
Ralph MacDonald – percussion (tracks 1-3, 5, 6)
John Abramowitz, Richard Locker, Charles McCracken, Kermit Moore – cello

References

1978 albums
Ron Carter albums
Milestone Records albums